The 2022 Cibubur truck crash occurred on 18 July 2022, when a tank truck crashed into an intersection in Cibubur, the city of Indonesia. The truck hit several vehicles on Transyogi Road. Several reported that the truck killed 11 people outright and injured a lot.

Accident
At 4:00 PM WIB, a Pertamina tank truck had a brake failure and lost control near the intersection which is located right between Bekasi and Bogor Regency and crashed into 2 cars and a large number of motorcycles. As a result, 11 were dead and others were injured.

The traffic light at an intersection is also considered to be the main accident, because it's located near a steep descent and a very sharp curve. It is also a proposal from Ciputra Group as the CitraGrand Cibubur CBD owner provides convenience for entering and exiting of the place.

References

2022 disasters in Indonesia
2022 in Indonesia
2022 road incidents
July 2022 events in Asia
July 2022 events in Indonesia
Road incidents in Indonesia